Fourth-seeded Maureen Connolly defeated Shirley Fry 6–3, 1–6, 6–4 in the final to win the women's singles tennis title at the 1951 U.S. National Championships.

Seeds
The tournament used two lists for seeding the women's singles event; one for U.S. players and one for foreign players. Maureen Connolly is the champion; others show in brackets the round in which they were eliminated.

Draw

Key
 Q = Qualifier
 WC = Wild card
 LL = Lucky loser
 r = Retired

Final eight

References

1951
1951 in women's tennis
1951 in American women's sports
Women's Singles